Kamau is a male name of Kenyan origin that may refer to:
It is primarily a masculine name in the Kikuyu, belonging to the Bantu group who migrated from the Congo region. The name was given to a group of young men who went through initiation together. The group was called Rika. The initiation process involved circumcision, training and mentoring to help transition from childhood to manhood. The young men in the group would take up their initiation group's name as a given name (Ritwa ria Rika) as a form of association, but would still keep their original name. Thus the man's original name may be Wambugu, but he may choose to use his Rika name Kamau. As a result, men usually had two or three names (Given/birth name, Initiation name and Nickname).

Though the tradition is not practiced, the name is passed on through the naming system in a family from the ancestor who had received the name through the initiation to the next generation. As a result it is now used as a birth/given name inherited from a relative and to many it has become a family name.

 Bruce Kamau, Kenyan-born Australian footballer
 Gibson Kamau Kuria, lawyer and human rights activist
 Daniel Kamau, Kenyan writer
 Ian Kamau, Canadian hip hop and spoken word artist
 James Maina Kamau, Kenyan politician from Nairobi County
 Jamleck Irungu Kamau, Kenyan politician from Murang'a County
 Johnstone Kamau Ngengi, birth name of Jomo Kenyatta, first Kenya president.
 Kamau Brathwaite, poet and writer from Barbados
KAMAUU, American singer and rapper
 Michael Kamau, Kenyan cabinet secretary for Transport and Infrastructure
 W. Kamau Bell, American stand-up comic
 Kamau Nkenge, American born radiology professional.

Kenyan names
Bantu-language surnames